Deer Park or Deerpark may refer to:

 Deer park (England), parkland originally used by the nobility for hunting deer.

Places

Australia 
 Deer Park, Victoria, a suburb of Melbourne, located within the City of Brimbank
 Deer Park railway station

Canada 
 Deer Park, Toronto, Ontario, a neighborhood

France 
 Parc-aux-Cerfs (English: Deer Park), a house at Versailles

India 
 Sarnath, Uttar Pradesh, a deer park which was legendary site of the Buddha's first sermon
 Deer Park (Delhi), in the South Delhi locality of Hauz Khas

Ireland 
 Deerpark, County Cavan, a townland in County Cavan

United Kingdom 
 Deer Park, County Antrim, a townland in County Antrim, Northern Ireland
 Deer Park, County Fermanagh, a townland in County Fermanagh, Northern Ireland
 Deer Park, County Londonderry, a townland in County Londonderry, Northern Ireland
 Deer Park, County Tyrone, a townland in County Tyrone, Northern Ireland

United States 
 Deer Park, Alabama
 Deer Park, California, in Napa County
 Deer Park, El Dorado County, California
 Deer Park, former name of Cedar Grove, Fresno County, California
 Deer Park, Florida
 Deer Park, Illinois
 Deer Park, Indiana
 Deer Park, Louisville, Kentucky, a neighborhood
 Deer Park, Maryland
 The Deer Park Hotel, built following the American Civil War
 Deer Park, Michigan, an unincorporated community
 Deer Park Township, Pennington County, Minnesota
 Deer Park, Missouri
 Deer Park (Omaha, Nebraska), a neighborhood of Omaha
 Deer Park, New York, Long Island
Deer Park (LIRR station)
Deerpark, New York, Orange County
 Deer Park, Ohio
 Deer Park, Texas
 Deer Park, Washington
 Deer Park, Wisconsin

Other uses 
 Cirencester Deer Park School, a secondary school in Cirencester, Gloucestershire, England
 Deer Park, the development name for Mozilla Firefox 1.5
 The Deer Park, a novel by Norman Mailer
 Deer Park Metropolitan Women's Correctional Centre, former name of the Dame Phyllis Frost Centre, a prison in Deer Park, Victoria, Australia
 Deerpark Mines, disused mine in County Kilkenny, Ireland
 Deer Park Monastery, a Buddhist monastery in Escondido, California
 Deer Park Refinery, Deer Park, Texas
 Deer Park Spring Water, a division of Nestlé Waters North America
 Deer Park Tavern, a historical bar and restaurant in Newark, Delaware
 Michigan's Adventure, an amusement park formerly named Deer Park, in Muskegon, Michigan

See also
 Old Deer Park, an area of open space in Richmond, London